Patrick William Daines Barrington, 11th Viscount Barrington of Ardglass (29 October 1908 – 6 April 1990), was an Irish peer and a writer of humorous verse.

Early life
Known to his family as "Pip," he was the only son of the Hon. Walter Bernard Louis Barrington, a merchant banker (a partner of Sir Lawrence Jones, Bt), and Eleanor Nina Snagge. His younger sister, Gillian Mary Barrington, married Maj. Richard Cosmo Alderson, son of Sir Edward Hall Alderson.

His paternal grandparents were Walter Barrington, 9th Viscount Barrington and the former Mary Isabella Bogue. In 1936, following the death the previous year of his grandfather's second wife, Charlotte, the dowager Viscountess Barrington, Beckett Hall, the family seat and estate were bought by the War Office for use as an artillery training school.

He was educated at Eton College and at Magdalen College, Oxford University. "In his younger days, as Patrick Barrington, he was a poet, publisher and puppeteer of delightful wit and ingenuity."

Career
After University, "he dabbled in diplomacy for a spell as an honorary attaché at the British Embassy in Berlin; but his unstoppable flow of conversation and untidy appearance did not find favour with the formidable Ambassador, Sir Horace Rumbold." He was called to the bar by Inner Temple.

During the Second World War, from 1940 to 1945, he worked at Bletchley Park decrypting German and Japanese messages. He was a member of the Bletchley Park Drama Group.  After the War, he worked in publishing becoming one of the early partners in Weidenfeld & Nicolson.

On 4 October 1960, he succeeded his uncle, William Barrington, to the titles of 5th Baron Shute of Becket, co. Berks; 11th Viscount Barrington of Ardglass, County Down; and 11th Baron Barrington of Newcastle, County Limerick.

In his later years, he "became a leading figure in the pro-life movement. He was a dedicated opponent of abortion legislation, and drafted the original aims and objects of the Society for the Protection of Unborn Children, of which he was chairman. He was also a founding member of the committee of the Human Rights Society, working to ensure that euthanasia did not reach the statue book."

Poetry
He is remembered for his humorous verse, which was featured in Punch magazine during the 1930s. A collection of his poems, including his best-known work, The Diplomatic Platypus, was published as Songs of a Sub-Man by Patrick Barrington (Methuen & Company Ltd, 1934).

Personal life
Lord Barrington, who lived with his eldest niece Jane ( Alderson) Carter in Oaktree Close, Virginia Water, never married, died in St Peter's Hospital, Chertsey, on 6 April 1990, upon which his titles became extinct.

References

External links 
Barrington's poetry
Barrington's peerage

1908 births
1990 deaths
Irish humorous poets
20th-century Anglo-Irish people
People educated at Eton College
Alumni of Magdalen College, Oxford
20th-century Irish poets
20th-century male writers
Irish poets
Patrick
Bletchley Park people